No Joke may refer to

No Joke (film), documentary
No Joke, section in Batman: The Killing Joke
No Joke!, album by the Meat Puppets 1995
"No Joke", song by Wishbone Ash from Illuminations